Samuel Cheetham (born 1896) was an English professional footballer who played as a right back.

Career
Born in Thatto Heath, Cheetham played for Hull City, Bradford City and Colwyn Bay. For Bradford City, he made 57 appearances in the Football League, scoring 9 goals; he also made 7 FA Cup appearances, scoring 3 goals.

Sources

References

1896 births
Year of death missing
English footballers
Hull City A.F.C. players
Bradford City A.F.C. players
Colwyn Bay F.C. players
English Football League players
Association football defenders